The Neville Brothers were an American R&B/soul/funk group, formed in 1976 in New Orleans, Louisiana.

History
The group notion started in 1976, when the four brothers of the Neville family, Art (1937–2019), Charles (1938–2018), Aaron (b. 1941), and Cyril (b. 1948) came together to take part in the recording session of the Wild Tchoupitoulas, a Mardi Gras Indian group led by the Nevilles' uncle, George Landry ("Big Chief Jolly").

Their debut album The Neville Brothers was released in 1978 on Capitol Records.

In 1987, the group released Uptown on the EMI label, featuring guests including Branford Marsalis, Keith Richards, and Carlos Santana. The following year saw the release of Yellow Moon from A&M Records produced by Daniel Lanois. The track "Healing Chant" from that album won the Grammy Award for Best Pop Instrumental Performance at the 1990 Grammy ceremony.

In 1990, the Neville Brothers contributed "In the Still of the Night" to the AIDS benefit album Red Hot + Blue produced by the Red Hot Organization. 

Also in 1990, they appeared on the bill at that year's Glastonbury Festival. Due to Art Neville devoting more time to his other act, The Meters, the band kept a low profile in the late 1990s onto the early 2000s. They made a comeback in 2004, however, with the album, Walkin' in the Shadow of Life, on Back Porch Records, their first newly recorded effort in five years.

All brothers except Charles, a Massachusetts resident, had been living in New Orleans, but following Hurricane Katrina in 2005 Cyril and Aaron moved out of the city. Aaron moved to Austin briefly at the invitation on his friend, the late blues club impresario, Clifford Antone. They had not been performing in New Orleans since Katrina hit the city; however, they finally returned to perform there at the New Orleans Jazz & Heritage Festival in 2008, being given the closing spot which had been reserved for them for years.

Infrequently, Aaron's son Ivan Neville (keyboards) and Art's son Ian Neville (electric guitar), both of the band Dumpstaphunk, have played with the Neville Brothers. 

The group formally disbanded in 2012 but reunited in 2015 for a farewell concert in New Orleans.

The Neville Brothers appear in performance footage in the 2005 documentary film Make It Funky!, which presents a history of New Orleans music and its influence on rhythm and blues, rock and roll, funk and jazz. In the film, they perform "Fire on the Bayou" with guests Ivan and Ian Neville.

Charles Neville died of pancreatic cancer on April 26, 2018, at the age of 79.

Art Neville died on July 22, 2019, at the age of 81. A cause of death has not yet been provided.

Discography

Studio albums
 1978: The Neville Brothers (Capitol)
 1981: Fiyo on the Bayou (A&M)
 1987: Uptown (EMI)
 1989: Yellow Moon (A&M)
 1990: Brother's Keeper (A&M)
 1992: Family Groove (A&M)
 1995: Mitakuye Oyasin Oyasin/All My Relations (A&M)
 1999: Valence Street (Columbia)
 2004: Walkin' in the Shadow of Life  (Back Porch/EMI)

Live albums
 1984: Neville-ization (Black Top)
 1987: Nevillization 2 (Live at Tipitina's Volume 2) (Spindletop)
 1994: Live on Planet Earth (A&M)
 1998: Live at Tipitina's (1982) (Rhino)
 2010: Authorized Bootleg: Warfield Theatre, San Francisco, CA, February 27, 1989 (A&M)

Compilation albums
 1986: Treacherous: A History of The Neville Brothers (1955–1985) (Rhino)
 1991: Treacherous Too!: A History of the Neville Brothers, Vol. 2 (1955-1987) (Rhino)
 1997: The Very Best of the Neville Brothers (Rhino)
 1999: Uptown Rulin' – The Best of the Neville Brothers (A&M)
 2004: 20th Century Masters – The Millenium Collection: The Best of The Neville Brothers (A&M)
 2005: Gold (Hip-O/UMe)

Singles

Related albums
 1976: The Wild Tchoupitoulas (with four of The Neville Brothers)
 1997: Wyclef Jean Presents The Carnival by Wyclef Jean (guest appearance on "Mona Lisa")

References

External links
 Official Neville Brothers Biography / Website
 Official Aaron Neville Website

Musical groups established in 1977
Musical groups disestablished in 2012
1977 establishments in Louisiana
2012 disestablishments in Louisiana
African-American families
American funk musical groups
American soul musical groups
Family musical groups
Musical groups from New Orleans
Grammy Award winners
Black Top Records artists
A&M Records artists
Neville family (show business)
Capitol Records artists
EMI Records artists
Columbia Records artists